Ceromya flaviseta is a Palearctic species of flies in the family Tachinidae.

Distribution
Germany, United Kingdom, Switzerland, Russia.

References

Insects described in 1921
Muscomorph flies of Europe
Tachininae
Taxa named by Joseph Villeneuve de Janti